E road may refer to:
 a road of the International E-road network in Europe
 E roads in Cyprus are secondary roads
 Malaysian Expressway System
 E roads in Zimbabwe are expressways
 Corridor E, a road from Morgantown, West Virginia, at Interstate 79 to Hancock, Maryland
 an electric road which provides electric power to vehicles on it, through trolley wires or conductor rails embedded in its surface.